The Girl Next Door is a 2004 American romantic comedy film directed by Luke Greenfield. It follows a high school senior who falls in love for the first time with the girl next door, but finds the situation becoming complicated after he learns that she is a former pornographic actress. It stars Emile Hirsch, Elisha Cuthbert, Timothy Olyphant, James Remar, Chris Marquette, and Paul Dano. The film received mixed reviews and low theatrical attendance at the time, but over time has gained cult film status.

Plot

Ambitious high school senior Matthew Kidman has been accepted to Georgetown University but cannot afford the tuition. As class president, he has raised $25,000 in order to bring a brilliant Cambodian student, Samnang, to study in the United States, but otherwise has found little else memorable about his high school experience. His friends, perverted film student Eli, and shy and awkward Klitz, rebuff his displeasure with their lack of risky behavior. His life suddenly changes when a young woman, Danielle, moves in next door. When Matthew witnesses her undressing, she sees him and storms over. Introducing herself to his parents, they suggest to Matthew that he show Danielle around town. During the car ride, Danielle coerces him into taking his clothes off and forces him to run naked down the street.

Matthew and Danielle bond through a series of flirtatious dares. At a raucous party thrown by a classmate, Matthew finally finds the courage to kiss Danielle. The following day, Matthew's reverie is shattered when Eli informs him that Danielle is a former adult film actress.

On Eli's advice, Matthew takes Danielle to a motel and treats her coolly. Danielle, insulted, abruptly ends their relationship. Matthew attempts to apologize, but Danielle decides to return to the adult industry. Matthew, Eli, and Klitz go to an adult film convention in Las Vegas where Kelly, an adult film producer and Danielle's ex-boyfriend, menacingly warns Matthew not to interfere with his business. Matthew ignores him, convincing Danielle to leave her past behind.

Days later, an enraged Kelly abducts Matthew from school and physically assaults him, saying that he cost him $30,000. Kelly offers to let Matthew erase his debt by stealing an award from his former partner, Hugo Posh. Once Matthew enters the house, Kelly calls the police and leaves. Matthew narrowly escapes and rushes to an important scholarship award dinner. High on ecstasy that Kelly tricked him into taking, he improvises a sentimental speech. Although he endears himself to Danielle, he does not win the scholarship.

Kelly exacts further revenge by posing as Matthew's student advisor and stealing the money raised for Samnang. Matthew fears that he will be implicated in the fraud. He turns to Danielle for help, and she calls Hugo Posh; they agree to make a pornographic film on prom night with Danielle's former colleagues and Matthew's classmates as actors. Eli directs the production, and when no one is able to perform an important scene, Klitz finds the confidence to undertake it. They celebrate the successful shoot; Matthew and Danielle have sex for the first time.

The next morning, Eli calls Matthew, informing him that the tape has been stolen. Matthew enters his house to find Kelly in possession of the tape and talking with his parents and principal. Kelly demands Matthew's half of the eventual profits. When Matthew refuses, Kelly plays the tape for the group, who are surprised to find that Matthew and his friends have made a modern sexual education film.

Hugo Posh and Matthew make millions, and Posh pays for Samnang's trip. Eli becomes a successful filmmaker, Klitz attends college and is pleased to learn that his classmates revel at his scene in the film, and Matthew attends Georgetown, bringing Danielle with him.

Cast

Reception

Box office
The film grossed $14,589,444 in the US, plus $15,821,739 outside the US, for a combined gross of $30,411,183.

Critical response
On Rotten Tomatoes, the film has a 56% approval rating based on reviews from 159 reviews, with an average rating of 5.60/10. The site's consensus reads: "The movie borrows heavily from Risky Business, though Hirsch and Cuthbert are appealing leads." At Metacritic, the film has a weighted average average score of 47 based on 32 reviews, indicating "mixed or average reviews". Audiences polled by CinemaScore gave the film a grade "B+" on scale of A to F.

Sheri Linden of The Hollywood Reporter called it a "Sharp, vivacious comedy." 
Desson Thomson of The Washington Post called it "An entertaining affair whose wild-card creativity never ceases to surprise."
Owen Gleiberman of Entertainment Weekly gave it a B- grade and wrote: "Risky Business had a great opening act and then descended into contrivances. This genial cardboard knockoff is contrived from the start but gets better as it goes along."

Joe Leydon of Variety gave it a mixed review, criticizing it for being "recycled" comparing it to Risky Business, American Pie, and 1980s Brat Pack romances, and calling the script "shamelessly derivative". He describes the lead actors as "attractive but bland" but praised the supporting cast, especially the "scene-stealing turn" by Olyphant. A. O. Scott of The New York Times wrote that the film "[o]ffers a view of pornography that is nonjudgmental, even celebratory, but at the same time its premise – that Danielle must be rescued from the shame and degradation of her old job – suggests a more traditional, disapproving point of view. Instead of addressing this contradiction, the movie is happy to wallow in it, which would be fine if it had any real pleasure to offer."
Roger Ebert gave the film 1.5 stars out of 4, describing it as a "nasty piece of business" and faulted the studio for marketing the film as a teen comedy.

Accolades

Soundtrack listing

 "I Believe in a Thing Called Love" by The Darkness
 "Under Pressure" by Queen and David Bowie – Opening scene
 "Angeles" by Elliott Smith
 "The Killing Moon" by Echo & the Bunnymen – Matthew first sees Danielle
 "Jump into the Fire" by Harry Nilsson
 "Something in the Air" by Thunderclap Newman – Matthew and Danielle in cafe
 "The Field" by Christopher Tyng
 "Take a Picture" by Filter – Matthew with Danielle after skipping class
 "Slayed" by Overseer – Matthew and Danielle entering the party
 "No Retreat" by Dilated Peoples
 "This Year's Love" by David Gray – Matthew and Danielle kiss at party and have sex in the limousine
 "If It Feels Good Do It" by Sloan
 "Electric Lady Land" by Fantastic Plastic Machine
 "Bendy Karate" by Phreak E.D.
 "Dick Dagger's Theme" by PornoSonic
 "Suffering" by Satchel
 "Break Down the Walls" by Youth of Today – Matthew sees Kelly in Danielle's house
 "Dopes to Infinity" by Monster Magnet – Inside the strip club
 "Spin Spin Sugar (Radio Edit)" by Sneaker Pimps
 "Big Muff" by Pepe Deluxé
 "Song for a Blue Guitar" by Red House Painters
 "Twilight Zone" by 2 Unlimited – Heading to Vegas
 "Get Naked" by Methods of Mayhem – Inside AVN convention
 "Mondo '77" by Looper – Matthew sees Athena (Danielle)
 "Think Twice" by Ralph Myerz and the Jack Herren Band
 "This Beat Is Hot" by B.G. The Prince of Rap
 "Turn of the Century" by Pete Yorn
 "Stay in School" by Richard Patrick
 "Funk #49" by James Gang
 "Lady Marmalade" by Patti LaBelle – Matthew dancing at scholarship dinner
 "Christmas Song" by Mogwai
 "Sweet Home Alabama" by Lynyrd Skynyrd – Kelly driving away with the $25,000
 "Arrival" by Mark Kozelek
 "What's Going On" by Marvin Gaye
 "Counterfeit" by Limp Bizkit (not credited)
 "Mannish Boy" by Muddy Waters – Danielle open the door before the cameras
 "Purple Haze" by Groove Armada
 "Lapdance" by N.E.R.D. – Entering the cafeteria on prom night
 "Everytime I Think of You (I Get High)" by Phreak E.D.
 "Lucky Man" by The Verve – Matthew and Danielle dancing in prom night
 "Sparrows Over Birmingham" by Josh Rouse – Matthew seeing lipstick mark and thinking about Danielle
 "Atlantis" by Donovan – completing the shooting and leaving cafeteria on prom night
 "Baba O'Riley" by The Who – Ending scenes
 "Maybe You're Gone" by Binocular – Credits
 "One Fine Day" by Alastair Binks – Credits

References

External links

 
 

2004 films
2004 romantic comedy films
2000s American films
2000s English-language films
2000s high school films
2000s teen romance films
2000s teen sex comedy films
20th Century Fox films
American high school films
American romantic comedy films
American sex comedy films
American teen comedy films
American teen romance films
Films about pornography
Films directed by Luke Greenfield
Films produced by Charles Gordon
Films scored by Paul Haslinger
Films set in California
Films set in the Las Vegas Valley
Films shot in Los Angeles
Regency Enterprises films